In enzymology, a xenobiotic-transporting ATPase is an enzyme that catalyzes the chemical reaction

ATP + H2O + xenobioticin  ADP + phosphate + xenobioticout

The 3 substrates of this enzyme are ATP, H2O, and xenobiotic, whereas its 3 products are ADP, phosphate, and xenobiotic.

This enzyme belongs to the family of hydrolases, specifically those acting on acid anhydrides to catalyse transmembrane movement of substances. The systematic name of this enzyme class is ATP phosphohydrolase (xenobiotic-exporting). Other names in common use include multidrug-resistance protein, MDR protein, P-glycoprotein, pleiotropic-drug-resistance protein, PDR protein, steroid-transporting ATPase, and ATP phosphohydrolase (steroid-exporting).

References

 
 
 
 
 
 
 
 
 

EC 3.6.3
Enzymes of unknown structure